The men's handball tournament at the 2008 Summer Olympics was held from August 10 to August 24, at the Olympic Sports Centre Gymnasium and National Indoor Stadium in Beijing.  Twelve nations are represented in the men's tournament.

The four best teams from each group advanced to the quarterfinal round, 5th and 6th teams in each group are classified 9th-12th by the results of their group matches. The losers of quarterfinal matches competed in the 5th-8th place matches by the same elimination system as the winners of the quarterfinals.

This event was the last to be completed in the 2008 Summer Olympics.

Qualification

Olympic Qualifying Tournaments
Tournament I:
Worlds 2nd: 
Worlds 7th: 
Europe: 
Pan-America: 
Tournament II:
Worlds 3rd: 
Worlds 6th: 
Africa: 
Top continent at the Worlds (Europe): 
Tournament III:
Worlds 4th: 
Worlds 5th: 
Asia: 
2nd continent at the Worlds (Africa):

Preliminary round

Seeding
The draw for the groups was held 16 June 2008.

Rosters

Group stage

Group A

Group B

Medal round

All times are China Standard Time (UTC+8)

Quarterfinals

Classification

Semifinals

7th–8th place

5th–6th place

Bronze medal match

Gold medal match

Rankings and statistics

Final ranking 

Source: IHF.info

All star team 

 Goalkeeper:   Thierry Omeyer
 Left wing:    Guðjón Valur Sigurðsson
 Left back:    Daniel Narcisse
 Centre back:  Snorri Guðjónsson
 Right back:   Ólafur Stefánsson
 Right wing:   Albert Rocas
 Line player/pivot:  Bertrand Gille
Chosen by team officials and IHF experts: IHF.info

Top goalkeepers

Top goalscorers

References

External links 
Beijing 2008 Olympic Games
International Handball Federation
European Handball Federation
Team Handball News 2008 Men's Olympic Qualification Summary

Men's tournament
Men's events at the 2008 Summer Olympics